Maple is a genus of trees and shrubs in the family Aceraceae.

Maple may also refer to:

Science and technology
 Flowering maple or Abutilon, a genus of shrubs in the family Malvaceae
 Maple (software), a mathematics software package developed by Waterloo Maple
 Maple BBS, a telnet-based bulletin board system developed in Taiwan
 Multipurpose Applied Physics Lattice Experiment, a medical isotope production reactor

Places

Canada
 Maple, Ontario, an unincorporated settlement
 Maple GO Station, a train and bus station
 Maple, Edmonton, a neighborhood of Edmonton, Alberta
 Maple Airport, a defunct airport in Ontario
 Maple Mountain (Ontario)

United States
 Maple, Bailey County, Texas, an unincorporated community
 Maple, Dallas, a neighborhood of Dallas, Texas
 Maple, Minnesota, an unincorporated community
 Maple Shade Township, New Jersey, a town in Burlington County
 Maple, West Virginia, an unincorporated community
 Maple, Wisconsin, a town in Douglas County
 Maple (community), Wisconsin, an unincorporated community in Douglas County

Bodies of water
 Maple Lake (Douglas County, Minnesota)
 Maple Lake (Polk County), Minnesota
 Maple River (Iowa), a tributary of the Little Sioux River in the U.S. state of Iowa
 Maple River (Michigan), any of three rivers in the U.S. state of Michigan
 Maple River (Minnesota), a tributary of the Le Sueur River in the U.S. state of Minnesota
 Maple River (North Dakota), a tributary of the Red River of the North in the U.S. state of North Dakota
 Maple River (South Dakota), a river of South Dakota

Organisations
 Maple Club, a multi-sport club in Barbados
 Maple Energy, an integrated independent energy company in Peru
 Maple (marque), an auto manufacturer
 Maple & Co. (also known as Maples), a London-based furniture retailer

People
 Maple (surname)
 Maple (gamer), League of Legends player Huang Yi-Tang

Ships
 USCGC Maple (WLB-207), a United States Coast Guard Seagoing Buoy Tender
 USS Maple (1893), a US Navy /US Lighthouse Service tender
 USS Maple (YN-20), renamed as USS Hackberry (AN-25) when launched in 1941

Other uses
 "Maple" (song), by Shizuka Kudo, 2002
 Maple (TV series), an Iranian television series
 Maple, one of the Geographic Beanie Babies
 Maple syrup, a food flavouring
 Operation Maple, a mine-laying operation in support of Operation Overlord (D-Day)

See also
 Kaede (disambiguation), Japanese word for "maple"
 Maple Township (disambiguation)
 Maples (disambiguation)